During the 2017–18 season AZ competed in the Eredivisie for the 20th consecutive season and the KNVB Cup.

Eredivisie

League table

Results summary

Results by matchday

Matches 

The fixtures for the 2017–18 season were announced in June 2017.

KNVB Cup

Pre-season and friendlies
The first training session for the new season began on 25 June. Friendlies were arranged with smaller teams in the Netherlands as well as a few additional friendlies against foreign teams touring the Netherlands.

Player details

|}
Sources: Squad numbers, Eredivisie en KNVB Cup stats,

Transfers

In:

Out:

References 

AZ Alkmaar seasons
AZ Alkmaar